Tai Po District is one of the 18 districts of Hong Kong. The suburban district covers the areas of Tai Po New Town (including areas such as Tai Po Market, Tai Po Industrial Estate, Tai Wo Estate), Tai Po Tau, Tai Po Kau, Hong Lok Yuen, Ting Kok, Plover Cove, Lam Tsuen Valley, Tai Mei Tuk and other surrounding areas, and its exclaves Sai Kung North, in the northern part of the Sai Kung Peninsula and including islands such as Grass Island (Tap Mun), and Ping Chau (Tung Ping Chau). Tai Po proper and Sai Kung North are divided by the Tolo Channel and the Tolo Harbour (Tai Po Hoi). The district is located in the Eastern New Territories. The de facto administrative centre of the district is Tai Po New Town.

Like Yuen Long, the area of Tai Po used to be a traditional market town. Tai Po New Town, a satellite town, developed around the area of Tai Po and on reclaimed land on the estuaries of Lam Tsuen and Tai Po rivers. It had a population of 310,879 in 2001. The district has the third lowest population density in Hong Kong.

History

The district is named after Tai Po. Tai Po's population dates back to the eleventh century, people would make sufficient money by clamming, pearl harvesting and fishing. In Yuen Chau Tsai, stone axe and pottery have been discovered which were believed to be made in Neolithic era.

Tai Po was the seat of the district officers that oversaw the whole of the New Territories with Island House as their official residence. The Island House was completed in 1906, 8 years after the Convention for the Extension of Hong Kong Territory. The New Territories was later split into the District North and South (Not to be confused with modern-day Northern District and Southern District of Hong Kong), as well as New Kowloon in 1937. Tai Po remained as the headquarters of the District North after the split. The old headquarters of the District is a declared monument currently. The District North and then further shrunk, which Sha Tin District, Yuen Long District (includes modern day Tuen Mun) and the modern day Northern District were split from the District North and District North was renamed Tai Po District, which oversaw Tai Po and nearby Lam Tsuen Valley, as well as an exclave on the northern part of the Sai Kung Peninsula. The seats of the Tai Po District branch of the Home Affairs Department as well as the Tai Po District Officer, is currently located in another government building, Tai Po Government Offices Building, in Ting Kok Road, in the northern shore of Lam Tsuen River.

The Tai Po District Council was formed as the Tai Po District Board in the 1980s, with elections held since that decade.

Geography
Lam Tsuen River Tai Po is located in the north of Hong Kong, northeast of Sha Tin. Even though the Tai Po Industrial Estate is located in the district, it is still one of the most unpolluted districts in Hong Kong. Tai Po's population density is considerably lower than Kowloon's, having many old, small villages in the mountains.

Tai Po is surrounded by fertile valleys which explains why it has held such population for over a millennium. Tai Po is covered with bicycle tracks, east of Lam Tsuen Valley and west of Tolo Harbour. East Rail line is the main connection of Tai Po to the rest of Hong Kong.

Tai Po has 460 hectares of purely woodland area, the largest in Hong Kong.

Islands

In addition to the mainland part of the district, the following islands of Hong Kong are under the jurisdiction of Tai Po District:
 A Chau (丫洲, Centre Island)
 Breaker Reef – Tai Po
 Bun Sha Pai
 Cham Pai
 Chau Tsai Kok
 Che Lei Pai
 Chek Chau (赤洲, Port Island)
 Flat Island
 Hau Tsz Kok Pai
 Hin Pai
 Kung Chau
 Ma Shi Chau
 Ma Yan Pai
 Mo Chau
 Ping Chau
 Sam Pui Chau
 Sha Pai
 Shek Ngau Chau
 Tang Chau
 Tap Mun Chau (塔門洲, Grass Island)
 Tit Shue Pai
 Wai Chau Pai
 Wu Chau
 Yeung Chau

Climate

Housing

Because Hong Kong is in a very densely populated region, Tai Po Town has copied the many urban areas of Hong Kong by building high-rise apartments. 320,000 people have residences in the town, making high-rise apartments necessary and mandatory. These high-rise apartments are located inside estates, such as Tai Yuen Estates and Fu Heng Estates. These high-rise apartments have floors ranging from the low apartments in Tai Po Old Town to the new estates in northern Tai Po ranging from 20 to 34 levels. The area is serviced by the Tai Po Hui Market, Built in 2004.

The Tai Po area also has many "village houses", resulting from a 1972 Hong Kong legislation which gave any male heir over the age of 18 who could prove he was descended from one of Hong Kong's original villages in 1898 the right to build a small house on a plot of land, either owned by the village itself or on leased government land.

There are also a few private housing development in the Tai Po area with "detached" and "semi-detached" houses which include communal recreational areas such as swimming pools, tennis courts and children's playgrounds, and entertainment facilities such as private cinemas, health spas and karaoke rooms.

Privately owned residential housing in Tai Po included Tai Po Centre, Plover Cove Garden, Uptown Plaza, The Beverly Hills and many other residential estates.

Transportation

Buses
Transportation in Tai Po Town is much like any other places of Hong Kong. Due to the high population, Hong Kong has double-decker buses. There are some buses that lead to the rest of Hong Kong such as the KMB bus route 271 that goes from Fu Heng Estate in Tai Po Town to West Kowloon Station in Tsim Sha Tsui and bus route 307 which goes from Central Tai Po Town towards the Central Ferry Piers via Central and Wan Chai of Victoria. There are also buses that lead directly to the airport such as A47X from Tai Po (Fu Heng) to Hong Kong Airport and E41 from Tai Po Centre (Tai Po Plaza and Tai Po Mega Mall) to Hong Kong International Airport within 90 minutes.

Railway 
Two railway stations along the East Rail line serve Tai Po, namely: Tai Po Market station (in the older district) and Tai Wo station (serving newer estates). Trains originate at the Hong Kong-Chinese border, at either Lo Wu or Lok Ma Chau stations, and travel south to Admiralty station in Hong Kong Island, passing through Tai Po on the way.

The railway, previously known as the KCR British Section, opened in 1910. The old Tai Po Market station opened on that date and was closed in 1983, when the modern station of the same name opened as part of an upgrading of the line by the Kowloon-Canton Railway Corporation. Tai Wo station opened in 1989. In 2007 the line was leased for 50 years to the MTR Corporation.

Tai Po Kau station served the Tai Po Kau area between 1910 and 1983. It has since been demolished.

Education

Tai Po District are roughly divided by two primary school districts. The 84 school district for Tai Po New Town and surrounding villages, while Sai Kung North belongs to the 95 school district; the Sai Kung District also belongs to the 95 school district.

As of 2018, there were 19 secondary schools in the whole Tai Po District, all located in the Tai Po New Town. The secondary school district of Tai Po District, was designated "NET NT6".

Several international schools are located in the Tai Po District. They do not belong to any school district. The Tai Po campus of Hong Kong Japanese School's International Section was opened in 1997. American School Hong Kong was scheduled to open in Tai Po in 2016. Norwegian International School occupied a building former known as The Tai Po Bungalow as campus.

Li Po Chun United World College, located in Ma On Shan of the Sha Tin district, is near to the border of Sai Kung North exclave of the Tai Po district.

The campus of the Education University of Hong Kong, formerly the Hong Kong Institute of Education (HKIED), is located in the Tai Po District since 1997. The institute gained university status in 2016. The campus is located just north of Tai Po Industrial Estate. It is the only university of the district.

The Chinese University of Hong Kong is located in the border between Tai Po and Sha Tin districts.

Sports

 Tai Po Sports Ground, an outdoor track and field ground, owned by the government and operated by the Leisure and Cultural Services Department (LSCD)
 Tai Po Swimming Pool, an outdoor swimming pool that next to the sports ground, owned by the government and operated by the LSCD

The government leased a government land to the Tai Po Sports Association in 1988, to run another public swimming pool. The swimming pool, which also known as the "Jockey Club swimming pool", was closed in 1999. A new swimming pool structure was planned to build. However, the construction was not yet finished, as of 2015.

The district had several sport complex for the local population, they were owned and operated by the government and located in the Tai Po New Town. Another facility, opened in 1983, Li Fook Lam Indoor Sports Centre, was operated by the Tai Po Sports Association Limited, a non-profit making limited company.

Football
Tai Po FC is the first district football team ever to make it to the Hong Kong First Division League among the 19 district football sides from the Hong Kong Third District Division League. The club plays its home games at Tai Po Sports Ground and has since won the 2008-09 Hong Kong FA Cup.

The district had several football fields (five-a-side, seven-a-side football) for amateur football. In 2016, another football fields and sport complex (which includes an indoor swimming pool) would be built.

Economy
Hong Kong Note Printing, which prints all the bank notes in Hong Kong, is located in the Tai Po Industrial Estate, an industrial area of light industries (food processing, printing, etc.)

Hong Kong and China Gas also has its major gas plant in the industrial estate, which supplies most (98%) of the town gas of the city from that plant.

Spa Resort Development
There is a plan to develop a spa hotel resort at Ting Kok, near Tai Mei Tuk. The site will occupy 61,000 sq m and has no more than 230 hotel rooms. Tai Po District councilor Yam Kai-Kong admits the benefits from tourism and job opportunities will be good but he is also concerned about the mangroves and increased traffic in the area.

Place of interests

 The Hong Kong Railway Museum
 Tai Po Waterfront Park
 Tsz Shan Monastery

Notable people:

 Chan Hok man ( 陳學文 ）： former principal of  valtorta college
 Tang Chun man ( 鄧俊文 ）： athlete of badminton team

Electoral subdivisions
The local council of the district, Tai Po District Council, was divided into several subdivisions, known as electoral constituencies. However, the border of those electoral constituencies would under review in each election. It was also accused of gerrymandering for the proposed change of the border for several constituencies in the district for 2019 election.

In the election of the Legislative Council of Hong Kong, Tai Po District belongs to the cross-district electoral constituency New Territories East.

In the past, Tai Po District belonged to the Regional Council, the middle-tier local government between the city's Legislative Council and the district councils. The Regional Council oversee the New Territories, while its counterpart, Urban Council, oversee Kowloon (including New Kowloon) and the Hong Kong Island. However, they were abolished. The executive function of the Regional Council was takeover by the Leisure and Cultural Services Department and other government departments.

Before the establishment of the Tai Po District, the area belonged to the District Office North (founded as the District Office which also oversee area around modern day Sha Tin), which its headquarter is located in Tai Po; the District Officer was also resided in Tai Po in the Island House on Yuen Chau Tsai.

The election for the village head, as well as councilors of Heung Yee Kuk, has its own electoral constituencies, which based on the boundary of the villages.

See also 
 List of areas of Hong Kong
 Sha Tin District

References

External links

 

 
Districts of Hong Kong